The Island of Despair is a 1926 British drama film directed by Henry Edwards and starring Matheson Lang, Marjorie Hume and Gordon Hopkirk. It was based on a novel by Margot Neville.

Cast
 Matheson Lang - Stephen Rhodes 
 Marjorie Hume - Christine Vereker 
 Gordon Hopkirk - Don Felipe Trevaras 
 Jean Bradin - Colin Vereker 
 Cyril McLaglen - Mate 
 J. Fisher White  - Doctor Blake
 Joe Nuts - Joe N. Nuts

References

External links

1926 films
British silent feature films
Films directed by Henry Edwards
1926 drama films
British drama films
Films based on Australian novels
Stoll Pictures films
British black-and-white films
1920s English-language films
1920s British films
Silent drama films